A technical writer is a professional information communicator whose task is to transfer information between two or more parties, through any medium that best facilitates the transfer and comprehension of the information. Technical writers research and create information through a variety of delivery media (electronic, printed, audio-visual, and even touch). Example types of information include online help, manuals, white papers, design specifications, project plans, and software test plans. With the rise of e-learning, technical writers are increasingly becoming involved with creating online training material.

According to the Society for Technical Communication (STC):  In other words, technical writers take advanced technical concepts and communicate them as clearly, accurately, and comprehensively as possible to their intended audience, ensuring that the work is accessible to its users.

Kurt Vonnegut described technical writers as:

Engineers, scientists, and other professionals may also be involved in technical writing (developmental editing, proofreading, etc.), but are more likely to employ professional technical writers to develop, edit and format material, and advise the best means of information delivery to their audiences.

History of the profession
According to the Society for Technical Communication (STC), the professions of technical communication and technical writing were first referenced around World War I, when technical documents became a necessity for military purposes. The job title emerged in the US during World War II, although it wasn't until 1951 that the first "Help Wanted: Technical Writer" ad was published. In fact, the title "Technical Writer" wasn't added to the US Bureau of Labor Statistic's Occupational Employment Handbook until 2010. During the 1940s and 50s, technical communicators and writers were hired to produce documentation for the military, often including detailed instructions on new weaponry. Other technical communicators and writers were involved in developing documentation for new technologies that were developed around this time. According to O'Hara: 

In the beginning of the profession, most technical writers worked in an office environment with a team of other writers. Like technical writers today, they conducted primary research and met with subject matter experts to ensure that their information was accurate. During World War II, one of the most important characteristics for technical writers was their ability to follow stringent government specifications for documents. After the war, the rise of new technology, such as the computer, allowed technical writers to work in other areas, producing "user manuals, quick reference guides, hardware installation manuals, and cheat sheets." During the time period after the war (1953-1961), technical communicators (including technical writers) became interested in "professionalizing" their field. According to Malone, technical communicators/writers did so by creating professional organizations, cultivating a "specialized body of knowledge" for the profession, imposing ethical standards on technical communicators, initiating a conversation about certifying practitioners in the field, and working to accredit education programs in the field.

The profession has continued to grow—according to O'Hara, the writing/editing profession, including technical writers, experienced a 22% increase in positions between the years 1994 and 2005. Modern day technical writers work in a variety of contexts. Many technical writers work remotely using VPN or communicate with their team via videotelephony platforms such as Skype or Zoom. Other technical writers work in an office, but share content with their team through complex content management systems that store documents online. Technical writers may work on government reports, internal documentation, instructions for technical equipment, embedded help within software or systems, or other technical documents. As technology continues to advance, the array of possibilities for technical writers will continue to expand. Many technical writers are responsible for creating technical documentation for mobile applications or help documentation built within mobile or web applications. They may be responsible for creating content that will only be viewed on a hand-held device; much of their work will never be published in a printed booklet like technical documentation of the past.

Technical Writers & UX Design 
Historically, technical writers, or technical and professional communicators, have been concerned with writing and communication. However, recently user experience (UX) design has become more prominent in technical and professional communications as companies look to develop content for a wide range of audiences and experiences.

The User Experience Professionals Association defines UX as “Every aspect of the user’s interaction with a product, service, or company that make up the user’s perception of the whole.”  Therefore, “user experience design as a discipline is concerned with all the elements that together make up that interface, including layout, visual design, text, brand, sound, and interaction."

It is now an expectation that technical communication skills should be coupled with UX design. As Verhulsdonck, Howard, and Tham state “...it is not enough to write good content. According to industry expectations, next to writing good content, it is now also crucial to design good experiences around that content." Technical communicators must now consider different platforms such as social media and apps, as well as different channels like web and mobile.

As Redish explains, a technical communications professional no longer writes content but “writes around the interface” itself as user experience surrounding content is developed. This includes usable content customized to specific user needs, that addresses user emotions, feelings, and thoughts across different channels in a UX ecology.

Lauer and Brumberger further assert, “…UX is a natural extension of the work that technical communicators already do, especially in the modern technological context of responsive design, in which content is deployed across a wide range of interfaces and environments."

Skill set
In addition to solid research, language, writing, and revision skills, a technical writer may have skills in:

 Business analysis
 Computer scripting 
 Content management
 Content design
 Illustration/graphic design
 Indexing
 Information architecture
 Information design
 Localization/technical translation
 Training 
 E-learning
 User interfaces
 Video editing
 Website design/management
 Hypertext Markup Language (HTML)
 Usability testing
 Problem solving
User experience design

A technical writer may apply their skills in the production of non-technical content, for example, writing high-level consumer information.  Usually, a technical writer is not a subject-matter expert (SME), but interviews SMEs and conducts the research necessary to write and compile technically accurate content. Technical writers complete both primary and secondary research to fully understand the topic.

Characteristics
Proficient technical writers have the ability to create, assimilate, and convey technical material in a concise and effective manner. They may specialize in a particular area but must have a good understanding of the products they describe.  For example, API writers primarily work on API documents, while other technical writers specialize in electronic commerce, manufacturing, scientific, or medical material.

Technical writers gather information from many sources. Their information sources are usually scattered throughout an organization, which can range from developers to marketing departments.

According to Markel, useful technical documents are measured by eight characteristics: "honesty, clarity, accuracy, comprehensiveness, accessibility, conciseness, professional appearance, and correctness." Technical writers are focused on using their careful research to create effective documents that meet these eight characteristics.

Roles and functions
To create effective technical documentation, the writer must analyze three elements that comprise the rhetorical situation of a particular project: audience, purpose, and context. These are followed by document design, which determines what the reader sees.

Audience analysis

Technical writers strive to simplify complex concepts or processes to maximize reader comprehension. The final goal of a particular document is to help readers find what they need, understand what they find, and use what they understand appropriately.  To reach this goal, technical writers must understand how their audiences use and read documentation. An audience analysis at the outset of a document project helps define what an audience for a particular document requires.

When analyzing an audience the technical writer typically asks:
 Who is the intended audience?
 What are their demographic characteristics?
 What is the audience’s role?
 How does the reader feel about the subject?
 How does the reader feel about the sender?
 What form does the reader expect?
 What is the audience’s task?
Why does the audience need to perform that task?
 What is the audience’s knowledge level?
 What factors influence the situation?

Accurate audience analysis provides a set of guidelines that shape document content, design and presentation (online help system, interactive website, manual, etc.), and tone and knowledge level.

Purpose
A technical writer analyzes the purpose (or function) of a communication to understand what a document must accomplish.  Determining if a communication aims to persuade readers to “think or act a certain way, enable them to perform a task, help them understand something, change their attitude,” etc., guides the technical writer on how to format their communication, and the kind of communication they choose (online help system, white paper, proposal, etc.).

Context
Context is the physical and temporal circumstances in which readers use communication—for example: at their office desks, in a manufacturing plant, during the slow summer months, or in the middle of a company crisis.  Understanding the context of a situation tells the technical writer how readers use communication.  This knowledge significantly influences how the writer formats communication. For example, if the document is a quick troubleshooting guide to the controls on a small watercraft, the writer may have the pages laminated to increase usable life.

Document design
Once the above information has been gathered, the document is designed for optimal readability and usability.  According to one expert, technical writers use six design strategies to plan and create technical communication: arrangement, emphasis, clarity, conciseness, tone, and ethos.

 Arrangement  The order and organization of visual elements so that readers can see their structure—how they cohere in groups, how they differ from one another, how they create layers and hierarchies.  When considering arrangement technical writers look at how to use headings, lists, charts, and images to increase usability.

 Emphasis How a document displays important sections through prominence or intensity.  When considering emphasis technical writers look at how they can show readers important sections, warning, useful tips, etc. through the use of placement, bolding, color, and type size.

 Clarity Strategies that “help the receiver decode the message, to understand it quickly and completely, and, when necessary, to react without ambivalence.”  When considering clarity the technical writer strives to reduce visual noise, such as low contrast ratios, overly complex charts or graphs, and illegible font, all of which can hinder reader comprehension.   

 Conciseness The "visual bulk and intricacy" of the design—for example, the number of headings and lists, lines and boxes, detail of drawings and data displays, size variations, ornateness, and text spacing.  Technical writers must consider all these design strategies to ensure the audience can easily use the documents.

 Tone The sound or feel of a document. Document type and audience dictate whether the communication should be formal and professional, or lighthearted and humorous. In addition to language choice, technical writers set the tone of technical communication through the use of spacing, images, typefaces, etc.  

 Ethos The degree of credibility that visual language achieves in a document.  Technical writers strive to create professional and error-free documentation to establish credibility with the audience.

Qualifications
Technical writers normally possess a mixture of technical and writing abilities. They typically have a degree or certification in a technical field, but may have one in journalism, business, or other fields.  Many technical writers switch from another field, such as journalism—or a technical field such as engineering or science, often after learning important additional skills through technical communications classes.

Methodology (document development life cycle)
To create a technical document, a technical writer must understand the subject, purpose, and audience. They gather information by studying existing material, interviewing SMEs, and often actually using the product. They study the audience to learn their needs and technical understanding level.

A technical publication's development life cycle typically consists of five phases, coordinated with the overall product development plan:

 Phase 1: Information gathering and planning
 Phase 2: Content specification
 Phase 3: Content development and implementation
 Phase 4: Production
 Phase 5: Evaluation

The document development life cycle typically consists of six phases (This changes organization to organization, how they are following).
 Audience profiling (identify target audience)
 User task analysis (analyze tasks and information based on the target audience)
 Information architecture (design based on analysis, how to prepare document)
 Content development (develop/prepare the document)
 Technical and editorial reviews (review with higher level personnel—managers, etc.)
 Formatting and publishing (publish the document).
This is similar to the software development life cycle.

Well-written technical documents usually follow formal standards or guidelines. Technical documentation comes in many styles and formats, depending on the medium and subject area. Printed and online documentation may differ in various ways, but still adhere to largely identical guidelines for prose, information structure, and layout. Usually, technical writers follow formatting conventions described in a standard style guide.  In the US, technical writers typically use  The Associated Press Stylebook or the Chicago Manual of Style (CMS). Many companies have internal corporate style guides that cover specific corporate issues such as logo use, branding, and other aspects of corporate style. The Microsoft Manual of Style for Technical Publications is typical of these.

Engineering projects, particularly defense or aerospace-related projects, often follow national and international documentation standards—such as ATA100 for civil aircraft or S1000D for civil and defense platforms.

Environment
Technical writers often work as part of a writing or project development team. Typically, the writer finishes a draft and passes it to one or more SMEs who conduct a technical review to verify accuracy and completeness. Another writer or editor may perform an editorial review that checks conformance to styles, grammar, and readability. This person may request for clarification or make suggestions. In some cases, the writer or others test the document on audience members to make usability improvements. A final production typically follows an inspection checklist to ensure the quality and uniformity of the published product.

Career growth
There is no single standard career path for technical writers, but they may move into project management over other writers. A writer may advance to a senior technical writer position, handling complex projects or a small team of writers and editors. In larger groups, a documentation manager might handle multiple projects and teams.

Technical writers may also gain expertise in a particular technical domain and branch into related forms, such as software quality analysis or business analysis. A technical writer who becomes a subject matter expert in a field may transition from technical writing to work in that field. Technical writers commonly produce training for the technologies they document—including classroom guides and e-learning—and some transition to specialize as professional trainers and instructional designers.

Technical writers with expertise in writing skills can join printed media or electronic media companies, potentially providing an opportunity to make more money or improved working conditions.

In April 2021, the U.S Department of Labor expected technical writer employment to grow seven percent from 2019 to 2029, slightly faster than the average for all occupations. They expect job opportunities, especially for applicants with technical skills, to be good. The BLS also noted that the expansion of "scientific and technical products" and the need for technical writers to work in "Web-based product support" will drive increasing demand.

As of May 2022, the average annual pay for a freelance technical writer in the United States is $70,191 according to ZipRecruiter.

Notable technical writers
 William Gaddis, author of  J R (1975) and A Frolic of His Own (1994), was employed as a technical writer for a decade and a half for such companies as Pfizer and Eastman Kodak after the poor reception of his first novel, The Recognitions (1955).
 Gordon Graham, an expert on white papers and former writing professor.
 Dan Jones, university professor and a fellow of the Society for Technical Communication.
 Robert M. Pirsig, author of Zen and the Art of Motorcycle Maintenance: An Inquiry into Values (ZAMM) (1974), wrote technical manuals for IBM while working on the bestselling book.
 Thomas Pynchon, American author of The Crying of Lot 49 (1966), Gravity's Rainbow (1973), and Mason & Dixon (1997), among others, wrote his first novel, V. (1963), while employed as a technical writer for Boeing from 1960 to 1963.
 Richard Wilbur, American poet. Worked for Boeing, as he mentioned in conversation.
 George Saunders, American author of Tenth of December: Stories (2013) as well as other short story collections, essays, and novellas, wrote his first short story collection, CivilWarLand in Bad Decline (1996), while working as a technical writer and geophysical engineer for Radian International, an environmental engineering firm in Rochester, New York.
 Amy Tan, American author of The Joy Luck Club (1998), The Bonesetter's Daughter (2001), and other critically acclaimed novels. Tan began writing fiction novels while she was a technical writer.
 Ted Chiang, American author of short stories including Story of Your Life (1998) and The Merchant and the Alchemist's Gate (2007), was a technical writer in the software industry as late as July 2002. 
 Marion Winik, American author and essayist, worked as a technical writer from 1984-1994 at Unison-Tymlabs, Austin, Texas.

Similar titles
Technical writers can have various job titles, including technical communicator, information developer, technical content developer or technical documentation specialist. In the United Kingdom and some other countries, a technical writer is often called a technical author or knowledge author.

 Technical communicator
 Technical author
 Tech writer
 Technical content developer
 Content developer
 Content designer
 Technical information developer
 Information architect
 Information engineer
 Information designer
 Information developer
 Documentation specialist
 Document management specialist
 Documentation manager
 Text engineer

See also
 Collaborative editing
 European Association for Technical Communication
 Software documentation

References

External links

Descriptions and links to standards for technical writers
Technical Writing Education Programs - Los Angeles Chapter, Society for Technical Communication (LASTC)
ISO/IEC JTC 1/SC 7 ISO/IEC JTC 1/SC 7 - Working Group 2 develops international standards for software documentation

 
Computer occupations
Mass media occupations
Technical communication
Writing occupations